WD repeat-containing protein 68 is a protein that in humans is encoded by the DCAF7 gene.

Interactions 

WDR68 has been shown to interact with DYRK1A.

References

Further reading

External links